Young Liars is the first major release by the New York City band TV on the Radio. Released in 2003 on Touch & Go Records, the EP helped establish the band's distinctive blending of electronica, doo wop, post-rock, and avant-garde styles.

The release featured the single "Staring at the Sun," which would later be remixed and reissued in their full-length album Desperate Youth, Blood Thirsty Babes. It contains an a cappella version of "Mr. Grieves," which was originally a rock song by Pixies, from the album Doolittle.

Track listing
"Satellite" – 4:33
"Staring at the Sun" – 4:01
"Blind" – 7:15
"Young Liars" – 5:12
"Mr. Grieves" – 4:10

Charts

References

2003 debut EPs
TV on the Radio albums
Touch and Go Records EPs